Kathy Salvi (born April 23, 1959) is an American attorney and former assistant public defender with the Lake County Office of Public Defender. Salvi was the Republican nominee for the United States Senate in the 2022 election in Illinois.

Early life and education 
Salvi was raised in a family of nine in Waukegan, Illinois.

Salvi received her Bachelor of Arts in communications from Loyola University Chicago in 1981 and her J.D. from Chicago-Kent College of Law in 1984. The same year, she was admitted to the Illinois State Bar Association.

Political career

2022 U.S. Senate campaign 
In March 2022, Salvi announced that she would challenge incumbent Democratic U.S. Senator Tammy Duckworth for her seat in the 2022 United States Senate election in Illinois.

Electoral history

References

External links

1959 births
Living people
21st-century American politicians
21st-century American women politicians
Candidates in the 2022 United States Senate elections
People from Waukegan, Illinois
Loyola University Chicago alumni
Chicago-Kent College of Law alumni
Women in Illinois politics
Illinois Republicans
Public defenders